Sushil Biswas was an Indian politician from West Bengal belonging to All India Trinamool Congress. He was a legislator of the West Bengal Legislative Assembly.

Biography
Biswas was a primary school teacher. He was elected as a legislator of the West Bengal Legislative Assembly as a CPM candidate from Krishnahanj in 1992. He was also elected from this constituency in 1996 and 2001. Later, he joined Trinamool Congress. He was elected from this constituency as a Trinamool Congress candidate in 2011.

Biswas died on 21 October 2014.

References

2014 deaths
Communist Party of India (Marxist) politicians from West Bengal
People from Nadia district
West Bengal MLAs 1991–1996
West Bengal MLAs 1996–2001
West Bengal MLAs 2001–2006
West Bengal MLAs 2011–2016
Trinamool Congress politicians from West Bengal
1955 births